René Jouveau (1906–1997) was a French poet and non-fiction writer. He received the Prix Broquette-Gonin from the Académie française for his book entitled Histoire du Félibrige in 1971.

Works

References

1906 births
People from Arles
1997 deaths
French poets
French non-fiction writers
Chevaliers of the Légion d'honneur
20th-century non-fiction writers